are a Japanese character franchise created as a joint venture between Sanrio and Sega Toys. Currently the third collaborative effort after Jewelpet and Rilu Rilu Fairilu, it is the first Sanrio franchise released as a musical group. The characters in Beatcats consist of Mia, Chelsea, Rico, Layla, and Emma. As a musical group, Beatcats are signed under the Japanese recording label Pony Canyon and marketed as a virtual band.

History
Beatcats was created by both Sanrio and Sega Toys as their third collaborative effort. Unlike its previous collaborations, which are meant to develop into their own Animated series and Manga, the franchise more dabbles into the music scene and made the characters a 5-piece Virtual Idol Unit. The aim for the new franchise is to appeal towards both the elementary and junior high school demographic, with "fashionable, cute and cool" appeal and "energetic dance and songs to encourage the feelings of excitement, love and friendship."

Sega Toys and Sanrio worked together alongside music company Pony Canyon for the band's songs and vocals. The company aims to release both songs and dance videos related to the group through social media, in hopes to resonate with the teen demographic and to build a world and lore around the group. Also, Sega Toys announced they will develop a smartphone game app for various mobile platform as well as release a variety of products and merchandise revolving around the group.

The group formally debuted on October 8, 2020 alongside their debut digital single which is streaming on several licensed music streaming sites including Apple Music, Spotify, and Amazon Music.

Members

Discography

Singles

References

External links
Official website 

Mass media franchises
Sanrio
Fictional singers
Joint ventures
Sega characters
Sanrio characters
Fictional characters introduced in 2020
Animated musical groups
Japanese idol groups
Japanese musical groups
Pony Canyon artists
Fictional cats